DVH may refer to

Darent Valley Hospital, an acute district general hospital in Dartford, Kent, England
Desert Valley Hospital
Dose-volume histogram
Dove Holes railway station, Derbyshire, England (National Rail station code)

See also
DVHS (disambiguation)